Wrinkles the Clown is a character created by an unidentified performance artist living in Naples, Florida, United States, as part of an elaborate art project. Wrinkles is a curmudgeonly homeless man who dresses as a clown and hires himself out to parents to scare kids  for "a few hundred dollars," offering to come to their homes and frighten misbehaving children. The character first appeared in a video uploaded to YouTube in 2015, depicting him emerging from beneath a young girl's bed in the middle of the night. Subsequently, the character appeared in several more videos, either frightening children at their homes or engaging in disturbing behavior such as waving to motorists from a darkened roadside. Concurrently, stickers bearing the clown's face and a telephone number began appearing around Florida and quickly went viral.

For years, Wrinkles' identity, motives, and the veracity of his videos were the subject of speculation. On October 4, 2019, a documentary, Wrinkles the Clown, was released, which revealed the performance art nature of the character while leaving his creator's identity anonymous.

Biography
In a November 2015 interview with the Washington Post, Wrinkles claims to be a 65-year-old retired and divorced veteran who moved to Naples, Florida, from Rhode Island sometime around 2009. Not satisfied with being a "boring retiree," Wrinkles bought his distinctive clown mask online and started to make stickers and business cards promoting his telephone number. Over the next few years, Wrinkles grew in popularity. Florida teenagers posted photos taken of Wrinkles on social media and Wrinkles himself said that he now receives "hundreds of phone calls a day".

The 2019 documentary Wrinkles the Clown debunked the claims made in the Washington Post article as having been made in character, as the retiree depicted in the film is revealed to be an actor hired by the "real" Wrinkles. Indicated to be much younger, the "real" Wrinkles admits that the character of the 65-year-old-man is himself a fictional alter ego he created to explain who he was under the mask. The real Wrinkles indicates that he is a performance artist, with the Wrinkles videos and viral campaign being a part of a long-running and complex art project. In July 2023 Wrinkles will make a YouTube channel.

Documentary
On February 3, 2016, local filmmaker Cary Longchamps started a Kickstarter campaign to raise money for a documentary about Wrinkles. The project was ultimately unsuccessful, with 87 backers donating $3,853 of the needed $45,000. Shortly afterwards, it was announced that Wrinkles had entered talks with other Los Angeles-based production companies to produce the film. In December 2016, Naples Daily News uncovered details which found that the media attention on Wrinkles in late 2015 was initially generated through viral marketing efforts from Longchamps, with one of the first online videos featuring Wrinkles being filmed at Longchamps' residence. However, Longchamps denies these claims, stating that the video set at his home was a coincidence. The sheriff's department of Collier County, Florida, has also stated it has not received any reports of "creepy clowns stalking neighborhoods, or walking the streets" with the intent to scare until the 2016 clown sightings. None of these sightings were confirmed to have occurred by the Collier County sheriff's department.

On August 27, 2019, it was reported by Variety that Magnet Releasing, a subsidiary of Magnolia Pictures that specializes in foreign and genre films, had purchased the rights to the documentary. The documentary, entitled Wrinkles the Clown, was released in the United States on October 4, 2019.

See also
 Evil clown

References

American clowns
People from Naples, Florida
Unidentified people